Peraleda de San Román is a municipality located in the province of Cáceres, Extremadura, Spain. According to the 2014 census, the municipality has a population of 316 inhabitants.

References

External links

Municipalities in the Province of Cáceres